Namhan Mountain is a 460 m peak in Gyeonggi-do province, South Korea.  It lies on the border between southern Seoul and the city of Gwangju (not to be confused with Gwangju Metropolitan City).

An old stone-walled fortress named Namhansanseong stands at the top, and is a tourist attraction.

See also
List of mountains in Korea
Geography of South Korea

Mountains of Gyeonggi Province
Mountains of South Korea